The EF 200–400 mm 4L IS USM Extender 1.4× is an EF mount super telephoto zoom lens produced by Canon. It is part of the professional L-series and functions with the Canon EOS line of cameras. The EF 200–400 mm lens features an ultrasonic motor, image stabilization and weather sealing. It is the first and only EF lens with a built-in extender.

History
The EF 200–400 mm 4L was first announced to be in development in February 2011 and a prototype was showcased at the 2011 CP+ tradeshow. In November 2011, Canon announced that availability of the lens would be postponed to an unspecified later date. The lens was only released more than a year later in May 2013.

Built-in 1.4× Extender
Although not the first lens to be equipped with a built-in teleconverter, an honor that belongs to the older Canon FD mount 1200 mm 5.6L 1.4× lens, the EF 200–400 is the first to be for the EF mount, and the first to enter mass production. The extender, when engaged, increases the lens' focal length by a factor of 1.4×, while decreasing the aperture by a single stop, changing the lens to a 280–560 mm f/5.6 lens. The extender is activated and deactivated by a mechanical switch close to the lens mount.

Specifications

See also 
Sigma 200–500mm f/2.8 EX DG lens

References

External links 

Lens overview from Canon USA
Canon 200-400 6 Month Test
Comparison with several other super-telephoto lenses by LensRentals.com
Canon EF 200–400 Lens review by Bryan Carnathan

Canon EF lenses
Canon L-Series lenses
Camera lenses introduced in 2013